Paul Theriault (born 1950) is a Canadian former ice hockey coach. He served as an assistant coach in the National Hockey League with the Buffalo Sabres during the 1996–97 NHL season.

Theriault is the longest-serving coach in the history of the Oshawa Generals of the Ontario Hockey League (OHL). He also served as an OHL head coach for both the Erie Otters and Sault Ste. Marie Greyhounds. Theriault was awarded the 1986–87 Matt Leyden Trophy as the OHL Coach of the Year.

At the professional level, Theriault was an assistant coach with the Buffalo Sabres during the 1996–97 NHL season when Ted Nolan won the Jack Adams Award as the NHL's Coach of the Year. He has also served as head coach for the Flint Spirits of the International Hockey League and the HC Asiago and HC Varese of the Italian Serie A.

Post-concussion syndrome
Theriault suffers from the debilitating effects of post-concussion syndrome resulting from when he was an NCAA player with the Lake Superior State Lakers men's ice hockey team from 1968 to 1971.

Awards and honours

References

External links

Paul Theriault's profile at Eliteprospects.com

1950 births
Buffalo Sabres coaches
Canadian ice hockey coaches
Ice hockey people from Ontario
Lake Superior State Lakers men's ice hockey players
Living people
Oshawa Generals coaches
People with traumatic brain injuries
Sportspeople from Sault Ste. Marie, Ontario